Vasili Yermasov (9 January 1913 – 30 April 1990) was a Soviet football goalkeeper and manager.

Yermasov was born in Tsaritsyn. He started playing football in 1932, in team sports club Krasnaya Zvezda Stalingrad. Later played for Dynamo Stalingrad and Metallurg Stalingrad.

Summit debuted at age 24, and on his first match came as a team captain. In the match of the 1937 Soviet Cup club Metallurg Stalingrad on his field had stubborn resistance of the team from second division Torpedo Moscow, losing only in overtime. Four teammates next season played for team from top division Traktor Stalingrad. Yermasov transferred to the major team of the city before the season 1940.

During the Great Patriotic War Vasili Yermasov went to the front, took part in the Battle of Stalingrad, and in May 1943, after the battle, was one of the organizers and participants of the famous .

3 February 1943 received the medal "For Courage", which was awarded 2 May 1943 before the match "On the ruins of Stalingrad", together with the medal "For the Defence of Stalingrad".

After completing his playing career, worked as manager of Stalingrad's football teams. In 1955–1956 he was the manager of the team Torpedo Stalingrad.

He died, aged 77, in Volgograd.

Sources
 
 

1913 births
Sportspeople from Volgograd
1990 deaths
Soviet footballers
FC Rotor Volgograd players
Soviet football managers
FC Rotor Volgograd managers
Recipients of the Medal "For Courage" (Russia)
Association football goalkeepers